The Walton River is a  tributary of the Cedar River on the Upper Peninsula of Michigan in the United States.

See also
List of rivers of Michigan

References

Michigan  Streamflow Data from the USGS

Rivers of Michigan
Rivers of Menominee County, Michigan
Tributaries of Lake Michigan